Pornsak is a given name of Thai origin. People with that name include:
 Pornsak Pongthong, a professional footballer in Thailand
 Pornsak Prajakwit, a Thailand-born media personality in Singapore
 Pornsak Songsaeng, a male Mor lam singer in Thailand